Francis Hugh Fox (12 June 1863 – 28 May 1952) was an English rugby union forward who played club rugby for Wellington and the Marlborough Nomads and international rugby for England. In 1890 Fox became one of the original members of the Barbarians Football Club.

Rugby career
Fox first came to note as a rugby player when he represented Wellington RFC, a team club from his home town in Somerset. He lived at Tone Dale House, Wellington, Somerset.

Bibliography

References

1863 births
1952 deaths
Barbarian F.C. players
England international rugby union players
English rugby union players
Rugby union halfbacks
Rugby union players from Wellington, Somerset